is a military base of the Japan Ground Self-Defense Force, located in Gotemba, Shizuoka Prefecture, Japan. It is one of several military facilities located in the foothills of Mount Fuji.

History
Camp Komakado was established in April 1936 by the Imperial Japanese Army as a training facility, and by 1943 it had become the central training school for Japan's heavy artillery regiments.

After the end of World War II, Camp Komakado came under the control of the United States Army in Japan, and was renamed “South Camp”.

In 1960, after the conclusion of the Treaty of Mutual Cooperation and Security between the United States and Japan, the base was returned to the control of the Japanese government and reestablished as a training facility for artillery and armor under the post-war Ground Japan Self-Defense Force. The JSDF 1st Tank Battalion has been based at Camp Komakado since 1962.

The International Peace Cooperation Activities Training Unit of the JGSDF Central Readiness Force has been based at Camp Komakado since 2007.

Organization
The following are units currently stationed in Camp Komakado:

Central Readiness Force
 International Peace Cooperation Activities Training Unit
 1st Training Brigade
 1st Armored Training Unit
 1st Tank Battalion
 1st Antiaircraft Artillery Battalion
 364th Engineer Company
JGSDF 1st Logistic Support Regiment
JGSDF Kantō Logistics Depot

References

External links
Official Home page
photo page

Komakado
Komakado
Military installations established in 1936
Gotemba, Shizuoka
1936 establishments in Japan